The 2018 United States Senate election in Ohio took place November 6, 2018. The candidate filing deadline was February 7, 2018; the primary election was held May 8, 2018. Democratic U.S. Senator Sherrod Brown—the only remaining elected Democratic statewide officeholder in Ohio at the time of the election—won his reelection bid for a third term, defeating Republican U.S. Representative Jim Renacci in the general election.

Democratic primary

Candidates

Nominee
 Sherrod Brown, incumbent U.S. Senator

Results

Republican primary

Candidates

Nominee
 Jim Renacci, U.S. Representative

Eliminated in primary
 Melissa Ackison, businesswoman
 Don Elijah Eckhart, candidate for the Republican nomination in 2016
 Mike Gibbons, investment banker
 Dennis Jones
 Dan Kiley

Withdrawn
 Josh Mandel, Ohio State Treasurer and nominee for the U.S. Senate in 2012

Declined
 Ken Blackwell, former mayor of Cincinnati, former Ohio State Treasurer, and former Ohio Secretary of State
 Rick Jones, Butler County Sheriff
 John Kasich, Governor of Ohio, former U.S. Representative
 Mary Taylor, Lieutenant Governor of Ohio (ran for governor and lost the primary)
 Pat Tiberi, U.S. Representative
 J. D. Vance, author and venture capitalist

Endorsements

Polling

with Josh Mandel

with Matt Huffman

with Pat Tiberi

Results

General election

Candidates
 Sherrod Brown (D)
 Stephen Faris (I, write-in)
 Philena Irene Farley (G, write-in)
 Bruce Jaynes (L, write-in)
 Jim Renacci (R)

Debates
Complete video of debate, October 14, 2018
Complete video of debate, October 20, 2018
Complete video of debate, October 26, 2018

Endorsements

Predictions

Polling

with Mike Gibbons

with Melissa Ackison

with Don Eckhart

with Dan Kiley

with Pat Tiberi

with Josh Mandel

Results 
The election was not particularly close, with Brown winning by 6.84%. Brown was the only Democrat who won statewide in Ohio in this election cycle. Brown was able to win re-election by winning back most of the Rust Belt, which swung Republican in 2016. Brown did well in Portage County, Summit County, and Trumbull County, which are all very heavily pro union counties. Brown also did well in the rust belt from Lucas County, home of Toledo, all the way to Cuyahoga County, home of Cleveland. Brown also trounced Renacci in Franklin County and Hamilton County home of Columbus and Cincinnati respectively; the latter, Hamilton County was once considered a Republican stronghold. Renacci, while performing well in most rural areas of the state, underperformed Mike DeWine, the Republican Party's nominee and eventual winner for governor. Regardless, Renacci somewhat overperformed in comparison to most polling before the election, while Brown lost in several counties he had won in his previous Senate races. Exit polls also show Brown had a very strong showing amongst minority and women voters, which was key to his victory. Brown was sworn in for a third term as the senior senator from Ohio on January 3, 2019.

By congressional district
Brown won 9 of 16 congressional districts, including the 1st, 10th, 12th, 14th and 15th  districts, which elected Republicans to the House.

References

External links
Candidates at Vote Smart
Candidates at Ballotpedia
Campaign finance at FEC
Campaign finance at OpenSecrets

Official campaign websites
Sherrod Brown (D) for Senate
Stephen Faris (I) for Senate (Write-in)
Jim Renacci (R) for Senate

United States Senate
Ohio
2018
Sherrod Brown